Christina Piovesan is a Canadian film and television producer. She is most noted as a producer of the films The Whistleblower, which was a nominee for Best Motion Picture at the 32nd Genie Awards in 2012, and Summer with Hope, which was a nominee for Best Motion Picture at the 11th Canadian Screen Awards in 2023.

An alumna of the University of Southern California, she launched her production company First Generation Films in 2007.

Filmography

Film
{{columns-list|colwidth=30em|
Miracle Mile - 2004
My Father - 2007
Amreeka - 2007
The Whistleblower - 2010
Red Lights - 2012, coproducer
The Lesser Blessed - 2012
Life - 2015
Regression - 2015Kitty - 2016Paper Year - 2018Mouthpiece - 2018American Woman - 2019Strange but True - 2019The Nest - 2020French Exit - 2020The Exchange - 2021Summer with Hope - 2022Alice, Darling - 2022Infinity Pool - 2023A Good Person - 2023
}}

TelevisionThe Artists - 2018Home Sweet Rome - 2022, executive producerPinecone & Pony'' - 2022, executive producer

References

External links

Canadian women film producers
Canadian television producers
Canadian women television producers
Living people
Canadian film production company founders